Prince  was a Japanese nobleman.

Biography 
In 1932, Tokudaiji began serving as a Chamberlain for Emperor Shōwa.  From 1937, he served as a Prince of the House of Peers.  During World War II, he served as a lieutenant colonel.  In 1946, he resigned as a member of the House of Peers.

Personal life 
Tokudaiji was married to Yoneko Matsudaira.  Their daughter Yoshiko was married to Kōshō Ōtani.

References 

1889 births
1970 deaths
Japanese military personnel of World War II
Kannushi
Kazoku
Recipients of the Order of the Rising Sun, 4th class
Tokudaiji family